Amelécourt is a commune in the Moselle department in Grand Est in northeastern France.

It is located on the main D674 road, north of the town of Chateau-Salins.

Neighbouring villages include Lubécourt, Gerbécourt, Vaxy, and Salonnes.

Population

See also
Communes of the Moselle department

References

External links
 

Communes of Moselle (department)
Moselle communes articles needing translation from French Wikipedia